Dániel Csóka (born 4 April 2000) is a Hungarian professional footballer who plays as a defender for Hungarian First Division club Zalaegerszegi.

Club career
Born in Zalaegerszeg, Csóka began his career at hometown club Zalaegerszegi TE, before joining English club Wolverhampton Wanderers in January 2017. Whilst a Wolves player he spent loan spells at Slovakian clubs DAC 1904 Dunajská Streda and ŠTK 1914 Šamorín.

After being released by Wolves, in September 2020 he signed for AFC Wimbledon following a trial. He scored his first and only goal for Wimbledon in a 5-2 defeat at Charlton Athletic on 12 December 2020.

On 4 July 2022, Csóka returned to Hungary to rejoin Zalaegerszegi for an undisclosed fee in order to be closer to his family.

International career
Csóka has represented Hungary at youth international level up to under-19 level.

Personal life
His father Zsolt Csóka was also a footballer.

Career statistics

References

2000 births
Living people
People from Zalaegerszeg
Sportspeople from Zala County
Hungarian footballers
Hungary youth international footballers
Zalaegerszegi TE players
Wolverhampton Wanderers F.C. players
FC DAC 1904 Dunajská Streda players
FC ŠTK 1914 Šamorín players
AFC Wimbledon players
2. Liga (Slovakia) players
English Football League players
Association football defenders
Hungarian expatriate footballers
Hungarian expatriate sportspeople in England
Expatriate footballers in England
Hungarian expatriate sportspeople in Slovakia
Expatriate footballers in Slovakia